The 2010 FIA WTCC Race of Japan (formally the 2010 FIA WTCC Kenwood Race of Japan) was the tenth round of the 2010 World Touring Car Championship season and the third running of the FIA WTCC Race of Japan. It was held at the Okayama International Circuit near Mimasaka, Japan on 31 October 2010. The first race was won by Robert Huff of Chevrolet RML and race two was won by Colin Turkington of Team Aviva-COFCO.

The final results were not released until two weeks later due to an appeal by Chevrolet RML against the use of sequential gearboxes by BMW Team RBM. An FIA investigation found the use of the gearboxes to be illegal and both of the factory BMW drivers were stripped of all points earned at the event, meaning Augusto Farfus was stripped of his race two victory and the win was handed to Turkington. The decision also resulted in Yvan Muller of Chevrolet RML securing his second world drivers' championship, his first with Chevrolet.

Background
After the Race of Spain, Muller was leading the drivers' championship with now only Andy Priaulx, Gabriele Tarquini and Huff able to beat him to the title. Sergio Hernández was leading the Yokohama Independents' Trophy.

SEAT León Eurocup driver Michaël Rossi made his World Touring Car Championship debut with SR-Sport, replacing regular driver Jordi Gené for event. Liqui Moly Team Engstler added a third car for local driver Yoshihiro Ito, joining Franz Engstler and Andrei Romanov. Wiechers-Sport expanded to two cars to run Masataka Yanagida in addition to full-time driver Mehdi Bennani. Scuderia Proteam Motorsport added Japanese racer Nobuteru Taniguchi and Taiwanese driver Kevin Chen. Turkington and West Surrey Racing returned to the championship, now racing under the Team Aviva–COFCO banner for the final two rounds of the season. Volvo Olsbergs Green Racing returned for their second event of the year with Swedish Touring Car Championship runner–up Robert Dahlgren behind the wheel. Macanese driver Henry Ho joined the grid with the Ho Kun Chei / Sports & You Asia team.

Report

Testing and free practice
Huff and Muller led a Chevrolet 1–2 in the test session on Friday with Alain Menu in fourth separated from his teammates by the BMW of Andy Priaulx. bamboo-engineering's Darryl O'Young in eighth was the fastest independent with returnee Dahlgren in ninth.

Farfus topped the first free practice session on Saturday, half a second ahead of Dahlren's Volvo. Menu was the leading Chevrolet in third with Huff fourth and Norbert Michelisz the fastest SEAT in fifth. Kristian Poulsen was the leading independent runner.

SR–Sport driver Tom Coronel was fastest in free practice two with Huff second and Tiago Monteiro third. Engstler was the top independent driver.

Qualifying
Priaulx headed a BMW 1–2 in qualifying with RBM teammate Farfus starting alongside him on the front row. Turkington had set the pace in the first part of qualifying, beating the factory BMW pairing. All the championship contenders made it through to Q2 in addition to Turkington, Farfus, Michelisz, Engstler and debutant Rossi. Dahlgren was among those to drop out in Q1, while the Wiechers–Sport drivers had their times removed for accessing data from their car in parc ferme at the end of the session.

At the end of Q2, Priaulx and Farfus had locked out the front row for BMW Team RBM with Huff the next of the title challengers in third. Turkington ended up fourth on his return to the WTCC ahead of Michelisz and Tarquini. Championship leader Muller was eighth while Rossi and Engstler rounded out the top ten.

Warm-Up
Menu was the fastest driver in Sunday morning's warm–up session with Monteiro second and Coronel third, pole sitter Priaulx was fourteenth. Dahlgren was unable to take part as he required an engine change, incurring a ten–place grid drop for race one.

Race One
The race started behind the safety car due to the severe wet conditions, Priaulx led away when the race was started on lap three. Huff passed Farfus immediately to take second place. Monteiro and Engstler slipped off the track at the first corner. Fredy Barth and Poulsen clashed further around the lap, Poulsen spun and took Stefano D'Aste with him. Huff and he eventually passed Priaulx on lap five. Muller was climbing up from eight on grid and made his way up to third place by the end of the race. Farfus had dropped down to fourth and was engaged in a close battle with Tarquini, who on lap six slid into the gravel trap at Williams and returned to the track in eighth place with only minor damage. At the end of the race, Huff was first with Priaulx second and Muller third. Yukinori Taniguchi was the Yokohama Trophy winner in eleventh.

The results of the successful appeal by Chevrolet to the FIA over the use of sequential gearboxes by the BMW Team RBM drivers meant Priaulx and Farfus were later disqualified. This promoted the bamboo–engineering drivers into the points with Yukinori Tanaguchi ending up ninth and O'Young tenth. Michelisz was promoted to third to take the first podium finish of his WTCC career.

Race Two
Michel Nykjær started on pole position for race two and led until lap nine when he slid off the track. Tarquini took over the lead of the race but went straight on at the Hobbs turn two laps later and retired, putting him out of championship contention. Farfus then assumed the lead of the race. His teammate Priaulx had spun into retirement after three laps, Yokohama Trophy leader Hernández did likewise after eleven laps. At the end of the race, Farfus took the win with Turkington holding off Muller to second. Nykjær ended up seventh while O'Young in tenth was the independents' winner.

After Chevrolet's appeal over the use of sequential gearboxes was taken into account and the BMW Team RBM drivers had been disqualified, Farfus lost the win and the victory was handed to Turkington, his first in the WTCC. Muller moved up to second and secured the drivers' championship title while Huff took the final podium position.

Results

Qualifying

Race 1

Bold denotes Fastest lap.

Race 2

Bold denotes Fastest lap.

Standings after the event

Drivers' Championship standings

Yokohama Independents' Trophy standings

Manufacturers' Championship standings

 Note: Only the top five positions are included for both sets of drivers' standings.

References

Results Booklet PDF at MST Systems

External links
World Touring Car Championship official website

Japan
FIA WTCC Race of Japan